Pintu Hidayah is an Islamic religious soap opera aired by RCTI. The series stars all SinemArt casts with the title of a different storyline every week. Pintu Hidayah was first aired from 2005 until 2007, and reruns can be seen on MNCTV.

Cast 
 Marshanda
 Alyssa Soebandono
 Asmirandah
 Kirana Larasati
 Nabila Syakieb
 Paramitha Rusady
 Febby Rastanty
 Farah Debby
 Putri Patricia
 Indra Bruggman
 Ayu Diah Pasha
 Helsi Herlinda
 Boy Tirayoh
 Ayudia Bing Slamet
 Fuad Zulkarnain
 Kiki Fatmala
 Henidar Amroe
 Cindy Fatika Sari
 Adrian Maulana
 Raya Kohandi
 Devi Permatasari
 Lulu Tobing
 Grace Wijaya
 Ririn Dwi Ariyanti
 Ade Surya Akbar
 Rionaldo Stockhorst
 Octavia Yati
 Ayu Anjani
 Adjie Pangestu
 Billy Boedjanger
 Matias Muchus
 Della Puspita
 Donny Damara
 Cheche Kirani
 Dina Lorenza
 Olivia Zalianty
 Chacha Frederica
 Eeng Sapthadi
 Krisna Mukti
 Richa Novisha
 Tyra Renata
 Syarmi Amanda
 Lucky Perdana
 Adam Jordan
 Aiman Ricky
 Nani Widjaja
 Ana Pinem
 Adhitya Putri
 Rachel Amanda
 Gisela Cindy
 Gracia Indri
 Novia Ardhana
 Tengku Firmansyah
 Alice Norin

Indonesian television soap operas
RCTI original programming
2005 Indonesian television series debuts
2007 Indonesian television series endings